Aida Birinxhiku (born 1999) is a Swedish politician. She was elected as Member of the Riksdag in September 2022. She represents the constituency of Halland County. She is affiliated with the Social Democrats. She became the youngest member of the Swedish parliament after the 2022 general election.

She was born to Albanian parents who came to Sweden in 1998 and graduated from Lund University after completing her high school studies.

References 

Living people
1999 births
Swedish Muslims
Place of birth missing (living people)
21st-century Swedish politicians
21st-century Swedish women politicians
Members of the Riksdag 2022–2026
Members of the Riksdag from the Social Democrats
Women members of the Riksdag
Swedish people of Albanian descent
Lund University alumni